Protein phosphatase 1 regulatory subunit 14A also known as CPI-17 (C-kinase potentiated Protein phosphatase-1 Inhibitor Mr = 17 kDa) is a protein that in humans is encoded by the PPP1R14A gene.

Function 
CPI-17 is a phosphorylation-dependent inhibitor protein of smooth muscle myosin phosphatase, discovered in pig aortic homogenates. Phosphorylation of the Thr-38 residue converts the protein into a potent inhibitor for myosin phosphatase. A single phosphorylation of CPI-17 at Thr-38 triggers a global conformational change that causes re-alignment of four helices.  Multiple kinases are identified to phosphorylate CPI-17, such as PKC, ROCK, PKN, ZIPK, ILK, and PAK. Agonist stimulation of smooth muscle enhances CPI-17 phosphorylation mainly through PKC and ROCK. Myosin phosphatase inhibition increases myosin phosphorylation and  smooth muscle contraction in the absence of increased intracellular Ca2+ concentration. This phenomenon is known as Ca2+ sensitization, which occurs in response to agonist stimulation of smooth muscle. In Purkinje neuron, CPI-17 is involved in long-term synaptic depression.

There are three homologues of CPI-17:
 Phosphatase Holoenzyme Inhibitor (PHI: PPP1R14B),
 Kinase Enhanced Phosphatase Inhibitor (KEPI: PPP1R14C), and
 Gastric-Brain Phosphatase Inhibitor (GBPI: PPP1R14D).

Clinical significance 

CPI-17 is up-regulated some cancer cells, and causes hyperphosphorylation of tumor suppressor merlin/NF2. In prostate cancer, CPI-17 expressions are reported to be associated with GWAS risk SNP rs7247241 T allele and increase cell proliferation.

References

Further reading